Řečany nad Labem is a municipality and village in Pardubice District in the Pardubice Region of the Czech Republic. It has about 1,400 inhabitants.

Administrative parts
The village of Labětín is an administrative part of Řečany nad Labem.

References

Villages in Pardubice District